Finiș is a commune in Bihor County, Crișana, Romania, two kilometers from the town of Beiuș. It is composed of five villages: Finiș, Brusturi (Papkútfürdő), Fiziș (Füzes), Ioaniș (Körösjánosfalva) and Șuncuiș (Belényessonkolyos).

References

Communes in Bihor County